Centric may refer to:

BET Her, an American cable channel known as Centric from 2009 until 2017
Centric Multimedia, greek company also known as Centric and Centric Holdings S.A
Centric (magazine), free student magazine of the University of Central Florida in Orlando, Florida
Centric, a well-known brand of Product life-cycle management (marketing) software